Nélson Alexandre Farpelha Estrela (born 29 April 1988), known as Minhoca, is a Portuguese footballer who plays for Rabo de Peixe  as an attacking midfielder.

Club career
Born in Ponta Delgada, Azores, Minhoca earned his nickname meaning "earthworm" in his native language for his dribbling ability while a youth player at Marítimo Sport Clube in his hometown. He began his senior career with CU Micaelense in the fourth division and, in June 2011, he signed a three-year deal with C.D. Santa Clara of the Segunda Liga, again in his native islands.

In January 2014, Primeira Liga club F.C. Paços de Ferreira secured Minhoca on a 3-year contract. He scored his first goals for his new team on 23 November, a brace in a 9–0 rout of amateurs Clube Atlético Riachense in the fourth round of the Taça de Portugal. His first top-flight goal was on 17 April 2016, in a 4–3 away win against C.F. União.

Minhoca returned to Santa Clara in May 2017, on a two-year deal. In his first season in his second spell, he contributed three goals as they were promoted as runners-up to C.D. Nacional. On 17 September he received a straight red card after half an hour in a 2–1 victory at Gil Vicente FC.

In July 2019, released by Santa Clara, Minhoca agreed to a one-year contract at Varzim S.C. in division two. At its conclusion, he dropped down to the third tier and joined S.C.U. Torreense.

References

External links

1988 births
Living people
People from Ponta Delgada
Portuguese footballers
Association football midfielders
Primeira Liga players
Liga Portugal 2 players
Campeonato de Portugal (league) players
CU Micaelense players
C.D. Santa Clara players
F.C. Paços de Ferreira players
Varzim S.C. players
S.C.U. Torreense players